Krzysztof Zborowski (died 1593) was a Polish Royal Deputy Cup-bearer of the Crown (1574–1576), supporter of the Habsburgs. In 1585 he was banished for conspiracy against Stephen Báthory of Poland.

See also
Zborowski family

References
 

16th-century births
1593 deaths
Krzysztof Zborowski